Probabilistic argument may refer to:

 Probabilistic argument, any argument involving probability theory
 Probabilistic method, a method of non-constructive existence proof in mathematics